Bethel Church Arbor is a historic religious shelter for Methodist camp meetings located at Midland, North Carolina, Cabarrus County, North Carolina. It was built about 1878 and is an open rectangular structure topped by a metal-clad hipped roof with flared eaves.  It measures 74 feet by 57 feet.

It was listed on the National Register of Historic Places in 1997.

References

Churches on the National Register of Historic Places in North Carolina
Churches completed in 1878
Methodist churches in North Carolina
19th-century Methodist church buildings in the United States
Churches in Cabarrus County, North Carolina
National Register of Historic Places in Cabarrus County, North Carolina